Kaikai is a surname, and may refer to:

 Ansumana Jaia Kaikai, Sierra Leonean politician
 Linus Kaikai, Kenyan journalist
 Moijueh Kaikai, Sierra Leonean politician
 Septimus Kaikai, Sierra Leonean politician and broadcaster
 Sullay Kaikai (born 1995), English association footballer

Kaikai may also refer to:
 Kaikai (ferry), a former ferry on Sydney Harbour
 Kaikai Kiki, an art production and artist management company
 KiKi KaiKai, a shoot 'em up video game

Drinks
 Ogogoro, a West African alcoholic drink, also known as kaikai